Erik Dueñas (born October 18, 2004) is an American professional soccer player who plays as a right-back for Major League Soccer club Los Angeles FC.

Club career
Born in Los Angeles, California, Dueñas began his career at the Los Angeles FC youth academy, being part of the club's inaugural under-12 side.

Los Angeles FC
On July 8, 2020, Dueñas became one of the first three homegrown signings for Los Angeles FC, alongside fellow Mexican-American teammates Christian Torres and Tony Leone.

Dueñas made his professional debut for Los Angeles FC on October 14, 2020 in a Major League Soccer match against Vancouver Whitecaps. He came on as a 71st minute substitute for Dejan Jakovic as Los Angeles FC were defeated 1–2.

International career
Born in the United States, Dueñas is of Mexican descent. He was called up to a training camp for the Mexico U17s in February 2021.

Career statistics

Club

References

External links
Profile at the Los Angeles FC website

2004 births
Living people
Soccer players from Los Angeles
Association football defenders
Los Angeles FC players
Major League Soccer players
American soccer players
American sportspeople of Mexican descent
Homegrown Players (MLS)